Amirabad-e Shul (also Romanized as Amīrābād-e Shūl; also known as Amīrābād) is a village in Malekabad Rural District, in the Central District of Sirjan County, Kerman Province, Iran. At the 2006 census, its population was 1,548, in 355 families.

References 

Populated places in Sirjan County